Terry Evanswood is a Merlin Award-winning professional magician who has appeared in live stage shows and on television throughout the United States as well as on international stages.  He has performed professionally since the age of ten.
Early in his career, Evanswood was awarded an entertainment scholarship to attend the Chavez College of Magic. In 1991, Evanswood became the youngest illusionist in history to perform at Hollywood's famed Magic Castle. Evanswood was presented with the Certificate of Excellence award, which was the first and only honor given by the American Museum of Magic.

Evanswood is a member of the International Brotherhood of Magicians and the Society of American Magicians having been endorsed by David Copperfield and Harry Blackstone Jr. He is a lifetime member of the International Magicians Society (IMS).

Evanswood has starred in review shows around the world including "Rio Ecstasy" in Cancún, Mexico; "Stars of Magic" in Sarnia; "Fabulous Miami" in Miami Beach, Florida and "Grand Illusion" at the American Hotel and Casino in Aruba. Recently, Evanswood has been touring Alaska as onboard entertainment for several cruise lines. Recently, he had his own theater show called Magic Beyond Belief in Pigeon Forge, Tennessee, which closed in late December 2010. Currently, he performs just down the road from the Magic Beyond Belief building at WonderWorks in a show called "The Wonders of Magic."

The Evanswood show is ranked as one of the top "Things to do" in Pigeon Forge by TripAdvisor

References

External links
 Official web sites
 Official Terry Evanswood's Theater website
 American Museum of Magic website

Living people
American magicians
People from St. Charles, Illinois
1970 births